Janet Cowell (born July 19, 1968) is the former  North Carolina State Treasurer, serving from 2009 to 2017, and is the first woman to hold that position in North Carolina. She was previously a two-term member of the Raleigh City Council and a two-term Democratic member of the North Carolina Senate, representing Wake County.

Early life and education
Cowell was born in Memphis, Tennessee.  She graduated from the University of Pennsylvania (BA), Penn's Wharton School of Business (MBA), and the Lauder Institute (Master's in International Studies).

Career
Cowell previously worked as an analyst with HSBC and Lehman Brothers, coming to Raleigh, North Carolina in 1997. While in Raleigh she was also a consultant with SJF Ventures as well as Sibson & Co. and, in 2000, went to work for the Common Sense Foundation.

Political career
In 2001 Cowell decided to run for Raleigh City Council. She was elected to one of the At-large seats along with Neal Hunt. She was re-elected with Hunt to the At-large seats in 2003.

In 2004, Cowell ran for the District 16 State Senate seat held by the retiring Eric Miller Reeves. Cowell won the Democratic party primary with 49% of the vote over Jack Nichols, Carter Worthy and Mike Shea. She went on to face Republican nominee Mark Bradrick, an insurance appraiser and Desert Storm veteran, and Libertarian Jason Mara in the general election. Cowell won the seat with 59% to 38% for Bradrick and 3% for Mara. She was completely unopposed in her 2006 re-election campaign.

As State Treasurer
Cowell announced that she would seek the Democratic nomination for North Carolina State Treasurer in July 2007. She faced Michael Weisel, a Raleigh attorney, and David Young, a Buncombe County Commissioner, in the primary election, winning the nomination with 46.43% of the vote. In the 2008 general election, Cowell defeated the Republican nominee, businessman and former State House member Bill Daughtridge, 53.62% to 46.38%. She was sworn-in on January 10, 2009. She was re-elected in 2012 over Republican Steve Royal, 53.83% to 46.17%.

On October 13, 2015, Cowell announced that she would not seek reelection or election to any other office in 2016.

Awards and honors
In 2012, Cowell was recognized as a "rising state and local leader" by The NewDEAL.

In July 2013, Cowell was ranked #21 globally on the Sovereign Wealth Fund Institute's Public Investor 100.

Electoral history

References

External links

 

|-

1968 births
21st-century American politicians
21st-century American women politicians
Living people
Democratic Party North Carolina state senators
Politicians from Memphis, Tennessee
Raleigh City Council members
State treasurers of North Carolina
Women state legislators in North Carolina
Women city councillors in North Carolina